Grenada competed at the 2015 Pan American Games in Toronto, Ontario, Canada from July 10 to 26, 2015.

On July 2, 2015 the Grenada Olympic Committee announced a team of 7 athletes in 3 sports (athletics, swimming and tennis). Swimmer Oreoluwa Cherebin was the flagbearer for the team during the opening ceremony.

After winning zero medals at the last edition of the games in 2011, Grenada won a silver medal at this edition through Kurt Felix's silver medal in the men's decathlon. This left the country tied for 25th on the medal table.

Competitors
The following table lists Grenada's delegation per sport and gender.

Medalists

The following competitors from Grenada won medals at the games. In the by discipline sections below, medalists' names are bolded.

|style="text-align:left; width:78%; vertical-align:top;"|

|style="text-align:left; width:22%; vertical-align:top;"|

Athletics

Grenada qualified a team of four athletes (three men and one woman). An original team of nine athletes were entered, but the team size was reduced after the organizing committee has to reduce the entries to the quota limit of 680.

Men
Track

Combined events – Decathlon

Women
Track

Swimming

Grenada received two universality spots (one male and one female).

Tennis

Grenada received one wildcard spot in the men's singles event.

Men

See also
Grenada at the 2016 Summer Olympics

References

Nations at the 2015 Pan American Games
P
2015